Bala Qaleh (also Romanized as Bālā Qal‘eh) is a village in Irandegan Rural District, Irandegan District, Khash County, Sistan and Baluchestan Province, Iran. At the 2006 census, its population was 111, in 24 families.

References 

Populated places in Khash County